Char Adhyay (English: Four Chapters) 1997 Indian Hindi language drama film written and directed by Kumar Shahani. It is based on Rabindranath Tagore's last novel by the same name, written in 1934.

The film is set in the late Bengali Renaissance of the 1930s and 1940s, and a group of young intellectuals and revolutionaries involved with the Indian independence movement. It deals with the impact of political issues on personal lives and questions blind nationalism and blind adherence to a leader and delves into the ugly face of idealism.

Most of the cast included non-actors, Nandini Ghosal was an Odissi dancer a disciple of Guru Kelucharan Mahapatra, Kaushik Gopal was a psychoanalyst, while Sumanto Chattopadhyay worked in advertising and acted in theatre.

Cast
 Sumanto Chattopadhyay as Atindra
 Nandini Ghosal as Ela
 Kaushik Gopal as  Indranath
 Shiboprosad Mukherjee 
 Shruti Yusufi
 Rajat Kapoor
 Ramchandra Parihar

References

External links
 

1997 films
Films based on Indian novels
Films set in the 1940s
Films based on works by Rabindranath Tagore
Films set in the Indian independence movement
Films set in Bengal
1990s Hindi-language films